Phryneta pulchra is a species of beetle in the family Cerambycidae. It was described by Tippmann in 1958. It is known from Cameroon.

References

Endemic fauna of Cameroon
Phrynetini
Beetles described in 1958